The Mexico Stone Store, also known as The Little Stone House, is a historic commercial building located at Mexico in Oswego County, New York.  It was built as late as the 1830s and is a one-story, stone building with a gable roof.  At the rear is a two-story frame extension.  It is believed to be Mexico's oldest surviving commercial building.

It was listed on the National Register of Historic Places in 2010.

References

Commercial buildings on the National Register of Historic Places in New York (state)
Buildings and structures in Oswego County, New York
National Register of Historic Places in Oswego County, New York